Janusz Łęski (12 February 1930 – 1 January 2022) was a Polish film director and screenwriter.

He was born in Radomsko, Poland. He became famous for creating popular films and series for children and youth. He died on 1 January 2022, at the age of 91.

Filmography 
 Miasteczko (1958; director with Julian Dziedzina and Romuald Drobaczyński)
 Na przełaj (1971)
 Sobie król (1973)
 Rodzina Leśniewskich (1978; TV series)
 Kłusownik (1980; serial TV)
 Rodzina Leśniewskich (1980; film version)
 Na tropach Bartka (1982)
 Przygrywka (1982; TV series)
 Urwisy z Doliny Młynów (1985; TV series)
 Klementynka i Klemens - gęsi z Doliny Młynów (1986; TV series)
 Janna (1989; TV series; director with Adam Iwiński)
 Janka (1990; film version)

References

External links 
 Janusz Łęski at filmweb.pl
 Janusz Łęski at filmpolski.pl

1930 births
2022 deaths
People from Radomsko
Polish film directors
Polish screenwriters